The Sparks Brothers is a 2021 British-American documentary film about Ron and Russell Mael, members of the pop and rock duo Sparks. The film, directed by Edgar Wright, and produced by Wright, Nira Park, George Hencken and Laura Richardson, premiered at the 2021 Sundance Film Festival and was theatrically released the following summer. It received critical acclaim.

Summary 
The documentary features lengthy interviews with Ron and Russell Mael, along with short interviews with musicians, record producers who collaborated with the band, previous members of the group who worked with the Maels in the various Sparks line-ups from the early 1970s until the early 2020s, as well as a number of fans. The documentary also includes several short animation sequences to reproduce apocryphal anecdotes between musicians with the participation of comedians and frequent Wright collaborators Simon Pegg (as the voice of John Lennon) and Nick Frost (as the voice of Ringo Starr).

Participants 

 Ron Mael
 Russell Mael
 Edgar Wright
 Beck
 Jane Wiedlin
 Flea
 Steve Jones
 Alex Kapranos
 Stephen Morris
 Gillian Gilbert
 Vince Clarke
 Andy Bell
 "Weird Al" Yankovic
 Thurston Moore
 Nick Rhodes
 John Taylor
 Björk (voice only)
 Nick Heyward
 Muff Winwood
 Pamela Des Barres
 Hilly Michaels
 Bernard Butler
 Jack Antonoff
 Todd Rundgren
 Giorgio Moroder
 Tony Visconti
 Dean Menta
 Les Bohem
 Christi Haydon
 Harley Feinstein
 Jonathan Ross
 Paul Morley
 Katie Puckrik
 Adam Buxton
 Neil Gaiman
 Tosh Berman
 Jason Schwartzman
 Mark Gatiss
 Mike Myers
 Fred Armisen
 Amy Sherman-Palladino and Daniel Palladino
 Scott Aukerman
 Patton Oswalt
 Simon Pegg as the voice of John Lennon
 Nick Frost as the voice of Ringo Starr

Production 
In June 2018, it was announced Wright would direct an untitled documentary film revolving around the band Sparks, with MRC Non-Fiction and Complete Fiction Pictures producing the film.

Principal photography began in May 2018, with Jake Polonsky as cinematographer, beginning with covering the band's concert at the O2 Forum Kentish Town. In April 2020, Wright announced that the film was "nearly finished".

Soundtrack

A soundtrack album was release on 4-LP by Waxwork Records in March 2022, as well as a Spotify playlist

Track listing

Release 
The film had its world premiere at the 2021 Sundance Film Festival on January 30, 2021. Shortly after, Focus Features acquired domestic distribution rights, while Universal Pictures will distribute the film internationally. The film also screened at South by Southwest in March 2021, and was theatrically released in North America on June 18, 2021, by Focus Features. It was released in the United Kingdom on July 30, 2021.

Box office 
In the United States, the film made $107,225 on its opening Friday and $89,652 on its second weekend. It was released internationally in territories including the United Kingdom ($334,184), Australia ($45,404), France ($80,267), Iceland ($477), Portugal ($346) and New Zealand ($9,499).

Critical response 
On Rotten Tomatoes, the film has an approval rating of 96% based on 160 reviews, with an average rating of 7.9/10. The website's critics consensus reads, "Their albums may be cult favorites, but this Edgar Wright-directed documentary offers an introduction to The Sparks Brothers that has something for everyone." On Metacritic, the film has a weighted average score of 80 out of 100, based on reviews from 33 critics, indicating "generally favorable reviews".

References

External links 
 
 
 Official clip
 The Making of The Sparks Brothers Documentary | Edgar Wright, Ron Mael, & Russell Mael Interview | Den of Geek on YouTube

2021 documentary films
2021 films
American documentary films
British documentary films
Films directed by Edgar Wright
2020s English-language films
2020s American films
2020s British films